Silver proteinate (brand name: Protargol) is used in electron microscopy with periodic acid and thiocarbohydrazide or thiosemicarbohydrazide as a positive stain for carbohydrates such as glycogen. It can also be used for light microscopy to stain nerve tissue. It is normally available as 8% silver in combination with albumin.

Because of its bactericidal properties it was used to treat gonorrhea before the discovery of antibiotics. The inventor of the first silver protein formulation was Arthur Eichengrün, a German chemist working for Bayer. It was introduced for therapeutic use in 1897.

See also 
 Medical uses of silver

References 

Silver compounds